Tugimaantee 76 (ofcl. abbr. T76), also called the Kuressaare ring road, is the ring road of Kuressaare. The road starts on the southwest side of Kuressaare from the small borough of Nasva on national road 77 and ends on the south side of the town at the port of Roomassaare. The length of the road is 13.5 kilometers.

T76 runs all the way through Saaremaa Municipality.

See also
 Transport in Estonia

References

External links

N76
Ring roads in Estonia